This is a list of soups made with fish or seafood.

Seafood soups

 Bisque, usually lobster bisque
 Bouillabaisse — a Provencal dish, especially in the port of Marseilles
 Buridda
 Caldillo de congrio
 Caldillo de perro
 Cantonese seafood soup 
 Chowder
 Bermuda fish chowder 
 Clam chowder 
 Fish chowder 
 Spiced haddock chowder 
 Chupe
 Cioppino
 Clam soup
 Cullen skink 
 Dashi 
 Fish soup 
 Fish soup bee hoon 
 Fish tea 
  Halászlé - Hungarian spicy fish soup
 Gumbo – often includes seafood, made with shrimp or crab stock
 Ikan kuah kuning — a Maluku and Papua dish
 Herring soup 
 Jaecheopguk
 Lohikeitto 
 Lung fung soup
 Maeutang
 Mohinga 
 Moqueca
 Paila marina
 Phở – some versions use seafood
 Pindang
 Psarosoupa 
 She-crab soup 
 Sliced fish soup 
 Sopa marinera — a Spanish seafood dish made with oysters, clams, seashells, crab, lobster, shrimp and spices like achiote and cumin
 Sopa de peixe - Portuguese fish soup, usually made using a tomato base. Very rich, it can include a variety of different seafood at the same time, and be a meal in itself.
 Tom Yum
 Ukha

See also

 Fish soup
 List of cream soups
 List of fish soups
 List of soups
 List of seafood dishes
 List of stews

References

 
Fish and seafood
Seafood